Villa Pojana or Poiana, is a patrician villa in Pojana Maggiore, a town of the Province of Vicenza in the Veneto region of Italy. It was designed by the Italian Renaissance architect Andrea Palladio.  It is conserved as part of the UNESCO World Heritage Site "City of Vicenza and the Palladian Villas of the Veneto".

History
The Villa Pojana was built in the years 1548–1549 for Bonifacio Pojana, a member of the Pojana family who had been local landowners for centuries. Bonifacio's  military background is expressed on the one hand by the severity and austere purity of the architecture and on the other hand by the decorative programme described below.

Architecture
Palladio's design was inspired by ancient Roman baths, which he had studied during a trip to Rome. The main floor is characterized by a large hall with a barrel vault ceiling (see also Villa Pisani in Bagnolo). At each side of the central hall, secondary rooms extend, each with a different type of vault. 
Villa Pojana remains one of the most curious examples of Palladian architecture even though the Villa was never completed and some of its latter development strayed from Palladio's original design. Of what was built, Palladio demonstrated some of his most creative work, especially in the building's main feature on the façade, a serliana with five circular holes (oculi), inspired from ancient Roman models, yet not derivative from any specific source. Other notable elements are the broken pediment, stripped classical features, and statues that depict both military and agricultural deities.

Decorative details

Palladio himself documented the interior decorations as being by Bernardino India, Anselmo Canera, and Bartolomeo Ridolfi. Canera and India were both painters of the frescos (India of the grotesques), while Ridolfi was a decorator and sculptor, responsible for stuccos and all fireplaces.

In the atrium, elegant stucco frames, whose floral designs entwine around trompe-l'œil reliefs, enclose monochromes of river gods, while here and there appear patches of sky populated with other deities. The bust of Bonifacio Pojana looks down from over the main entrance, and above him are the family's coat of arms and military trophies. Other decorations depict Pompeian scenes with the backgrounds and landscapes strewn with picturesque ruins and broken columns, whilst monochromatic figures of warriors stand watch in the trompe-l'œil niches. The frescoed ceiling, with the allegory of Fortuna, is attributed to Giovanni Battista Zelotti.

The most significant fresco can be found in the central hall: called the Emperors' Salon it shows a family from classical times, dressed in tunics and togas. They kneel in front of an altar whilst the pater familias extinguishes the torch of war at the feet of the statue of Peace which stands on the altar. It is a clear allusion to the peace painfully achieved in the sixteenth century after the War of the League of Cambrai which allowed Venetians to enjoy the delights of the terra firma.

See also

 Palladian Villas of the Veneto
 Palazzo Pojana, Vicenza

References

Houses completed in 1549
Andrea Palladio buildings
Pojana
Palladian villas of Veneto
1549 establishments in the Republic of Venice